Charu is a Sanskrit word that means 'sweet'.

Name
Charu is a popular name given to Hindu women. Notable people with the name Charu include:

 Charu Majumdar: The founder of Naxalbari Andolan in India
 Charulata: Eponymous protagonist of Satyajit Ray's movie

Other meanings
In Sanskrit, charu is the name of a flower.

Charu is a sweet porridge-like foodstuff offered as ahuti (offering) in the Yajnas.

Charu Hasini, or 'sweet smiler', is an epithet of the goddess Rukmini.

In Telugu, the dish rasam is known as charu. In Kannada, it is known as saru or sar.

References

Sanskrit words and phrases
Sanskrit-language names